Kim Jae-hwan (Hangul: 김재환, born May 27, 1996), known mononymously as Jaehwan (Hangul: 재환), is a South Korean singer-songwriter, known for finishing fourth in Produce 101 (season 2). He is a former member of the South Korean boy group Wanna One. As the group promoted for a year and a half, it achieved both critical and commercial success with all four of its albums topping South Korea's Gaon Album Chart and all five of its lead singles ranking in the top three of South Korea's Gaon Digital Chart.

Kim debuted as a soloist with his first extended play, Another, which was released on May 20, 2019.

Career

2012–2016: Career beginnings
Kim Jae-hwan first appeared in 2012 as a contestant in the second season of Korea's Got Talent. He auditioned in Daegu with his own rendition of Miss A's "Bad Girl Good Girl" but did not advance to the next round. However, judge Kim Gura made a special request to let Kim audition again in Seoul, where he received the two votes needed to continue in the show. He made it to the semi-finals before being eliminated.

After the show, Kim became a trainee under The Music Works and was selected to be one of the four members of ShelRock, a "hybrid rock" band produced by singer Baek Ji-young. The band frequently busked on the streets of Hongdae and held guerilla performances at different high schools around Seoul to promote the band prior to their debut. They even made an appearance on Yang Song E's music video for her debut single "Smiling Goodbye". Unfortunately, in August 2015, debut plants fell through, and ShelRock disbanded. Kim eventually left The Music Works.

In 2016, Kim appeared on the pilot episode of SBS' Vocal War: God's Voice. He challenged veteran singer Yoon Do-hyun with his own rendition of YB's "Autumn Outside the Post Office" and won, becoming the show's first winner. In the next round, he challenged Lena Park with a cover of Park's "Sorry" but did not win, eliminating him as a contestant.

2017–2018: Produce 101 and Wanna One

Kim participated in Produce 101 Season 2 as one of the five "Individual Trainees", or trainees not signed under an agency. He quickly garnered attention for his strong vocal skills during the show's first evaluation, where he performed Super Junior's "Sorry, Sorry". In the finale, Kim finished fourth with 1,051,735 votes, securing him a spot in Wanna One.

Kim officially debuted with Wanna One during Wanna One Premier Show-Con on August 7, 2017 at the Gocheok Sky Dome with the group's first mini-album 1×1=1 (To Be One). The following day, on August 8, it was reported that Kim signed an exclusive contract with CJ E&M to become an official artist under the company after the group's disbandment at the end of 2018.

On December 31, 2018, Wanna One disbanded, and Kim made his final appearance as a member of the group during their final concert named Therefore 2019.

2019–present: Solo debut
In 2019, Kim signed with Swing Entertainment, which previously managed Wanna One. Kim's debut extended play, Another, accompanied with the title track "Begin Again", was released on May 20, 2019. His second extended play, Moment, accompanied with the double title tracks "The Time I Need" and "Nuna", was released on December 12, 2019.

On April 7, 2021, Kim released his third extended play Change, accompanied with the title track "I Wouldn't Look For You".

On December 27, 2021, Kim released his fourth extended play The Letter, accompanied with the title track "Unforgettable".

On June 5, 2022, Kim released the digital single "Snail".

On July 13, 2022, Kim released "Delete", a cover of the song by Lee Seung-gi, as part of the Additional Memory Project.

On July 12, 2022, his agency announced that Kim would hold the 2022 Kim Jae Hwan fan concert 'I_My_Me_Mine' at the Blue Square Mastercard Hall in Hannam-dong, Seoul on August 20.

On September 5, 2022, Kim released his fifth mini album Empty Dream.

In February 2023, Kim will join Park Woo-jin's b-side song "Self-Portrait" which will be released on February 15.In March 2023, Kim is scheduled to release the single "Spring Breeze", which is set to be released on March 20.

Discography

Extended plays

Singles

As lead artist

Collaborations

Soundtrack appearances

Other songs

Other charted songs

Composing and songwriting
Korea Music Copyright Association (KOMCA) Registration Number: 10021953, Registration Name: 김재환

Filmography

Television shows

Web shows

Radio shows

Awards and nominations

Notes

References

External links

Living people
Korea's Got Talent contestants
Produce 101 contestants
K-pop singers
South Korean television personalities
South Korean male idols
South Korean singer-songwriters
South Korean dance musicians
South Korean pop singers
South Korean contemporary R&B singers
Swing Entertainment artists
21st-century South Korean singers
Wanna One members
1996 births